The Wild Hunt is the second studio album by Swedish folk musician The Tallest Man on Earth. It was released on 13 April 2010 by Dead Oceans.

As of 2011, the album has sold 35,524 copies in United States, according to Nielsen SoundScan.

Critical reception

Critical reception for The Wild Hunt was generally positive. The album has a score of 79 out of 100 on the review aggregate website Metacritic based on reviews from 26 critics.

The Wild Hunt was voted the top album of 2010 by the staff of Sputnikmusic. Pitchfork placed it at number 33 on its list of the top 50 albums of 2010.

Track listing

Charts

References

2010 albums
The Tallest Man on Earth albums
Dead Oceans albums